The Reasons Why may refer to:

The Reasons Why (album), a 1994 album by country singer Michelle Wright
Reasons Why: The Very Best, by Nickel Creek
The Reasons Why, a band with no recordings, featuring future members of Kansas (band)

See also 
Reason (argument)
The Reason Why
Reason Why?